Invasion is an American science fiction television series created by Simon Kinberg and David Weil. It premiered on Apple TV+ on October 22, 2021. The series has received a mixed critical response. In December 2021, the series was renewed for a second season.

Premise
An alien invasion is seen through the different perspectives of various people on different continents across the world.

Cast 
 Golshifteh Farahani as Aneesha Malik
 Shamier Anderson as Trevante Cole
 Shioli Kutsuna as Mitsuki Yamato
 Firas Nassar as Ahmed "Manny" Malik
 Aziz Capkurt as Kuchi 
 Billy Barratt as Caspar Morrow
 Azhy Robertson as Luke Malik
 Tara Moayedi as Sarah Malik
 Daisuke Tsuji as Kaito Kawaguchi
 Sam Neill as Sheriff Jim Bell Tyson

Episodes

Production

Development 
Apple gave an order for ten episodes in January 2019 with Simon Kinberg and David Weil creating, writing, and executive producing the series, with Audrey Chon also executive producing. Deadline reported that Chad Feehan was briefly brought in as a showrunner "out of necessity", but soon departed the series in September 2019. When filming was announced to resume, Jakob Verbruggen was said to be director and executive producer of the series with Amy Kaufman, Andrew Baldwin, and Elisa Ellis also executive producing; however, further reporting stated that Amanda Marsalis had also directed some episodes of the series. Invasion is reported to have a $200million budget. On December 8, 2021, Apple renewed the series for a second season.

Casting 
Deadline revealed in August 2020 that Neill, Anderson, Farahani, Nassar, and Kutsuna were all to be part of the cast.

Filming 
Filming was originally planned to commence in mid-2019 with Kinberg directing but was delayed due to his work on the feature film The 355. According to a report by Deadline, Invasion planned to film in New York, Manchester, Morocco, and Japan. "Portions of the series had been shot in New York and Morocco, and producers were prepping for the UK shoot when the coronavirus-related industry shutdown started in mid-March." In February 2021, filming occurred in Greenwich, one of the last filming locations for the series. Filming for the first season concluded on March 15.

Release 
The series premiered on October 22, 2021, with the release of its first three episodes; Season one concluded on December 10, 2021.

Reception
The review aggregator website Rotten Tomatoes reported a 47% approval rating with an average rating of 5.4/10, based on 36 critic reviews. The website's critics consensus reads, "Invasion attempts a slow burn but inadvertently lets its tension completely fizzle out with leaden pacing that will leave viewers impatient for the alien apocalypse to finally arrive." Metacritic, which uses a weighted average, assigned a score of 51 out of 100 based on 15 critics, indicating "mixed or average reviews".

Daniel Fienberg, writing for The Hollywood Reporter, said that "Invasion verges on 10 episodes of setup so pure and unfulfilling that a better title would be Evasion". He called the series, "amusing at first, then annoying, and finally, simply confusing", but praised Sam Neill's performance.

References

External links
 at Apple TV+

Alien invasions in television
2020s American science fiction television series
2021 American television series debuts
Apple TV+ original programming
English-language television shows
Television series created by Simon Kinberg
Television shows filmed in the United Kingdom
Television productions suspended due to the COVID-19 pandemic
Television series by Boat Rocker Media